The native fishes of Arizona are the species of freshwater fish that are found naturally among the inland waterways of Arizona, United States.

Habitats of Arizona fishes 

Arizona is known to have climate ranging from dry and hot at lower elevations to cold weather on the high mountains. Since water in the state is influenced by the climate, the habitats of Arizona native fishes are diverse. Most habitats for these fishes consist of flowing streams among the inland waterways of Arizona. The state is mostly drained by the Colorado River and its tributary, with the main tributaries being the Gila River, the basin of the Little Colorado River,

For thousands of years, Arizona's native fishes have adapted to life in habitats ranging from small springs to the raging torrents of the Colorado River. Their ability to adjust to periods of drought and flash floods is truly a marvel of nature and has been the key to their survival. Unfortunately, native fishes have not done as well adapting to the influences of humans on their environment. Habitat loss and alteration, and the introduction of non-native fish species have caused sharp declines in many native populations. With one species already extinct, more than 70 percent listed as Wildlife of Special Concern in Arizona, and over 50 percent federally listed as endangered or threatened, a special and irreplaceable part of Arizona could easily be lost, as many of these species are now threatened, endangered, or extinct. The state of Arizona first placed native fish on the endangered species list in 1988; however, detrimental human activities including aquifer pumping, reduction in stream flows, and predation from non-native green sunfish, have acted as major contributing factors to the decline of these native species. Many smaller rivers and creeks in Arizona are now dry except for periods of heavy rain.

The Arizona Game and Fish Department, along with numerous government agencies, conservation organizations, and many members of the public have become stewards of Arizona's native fish species, striving to preserve a link to the past in order to serve as a legacy to future generations. The San Bernardino Ranch has plans to reintroduce new fish specimens in an attempt to recharge Arizona native fish. Other projects involve the protection of native fish habitat on federal lands. A large decline in wetlands and riparian zones are the major factor in the decline of native fish, due to agriculture, outwelling, dredging, and flood control.

Many reservoirs, lakes and ponds make up a quiet-water habitat, which ranges from cold water lakes to hot desert pools. The largest standing bodies of water in Arizona includes lakes Powell, Mead, Mohave, and Havasu, all are formed by impoundment of the Colorado River mainstream. Small reservoirs are generally most common at intermediate and high elevations, and developed in many cases for recreational purposes.

Protection status under U.S. Endangered Species Act of 1973 (16 U.S.C. 1531-1544)

References 

 Native Fishes in Arizona
 List of Arizona Native Fishes
 Recovering Endangered Fish Species
  Nature Conservancy of Arizona

Fish
Arizona
.Arizona
.Arizona